West Queen's was a federal electoral district in Prince Edward Island, Canada, that was  represented in the House of Commons of Canada from 1896 to 1904.

This riding was created in 1892 from parts of Queen's County riding.

It was abolished in 1903 when it was merged into Queen's  riding.

It consisted of the city of Charlottetown and the western part of Queen's County.

Election results

By-election: On Mr. Davies being appointed Minister of Marine and Fisheries, 11 July 1896

By-election: On Mr. Davies being appointed Puisne Judge, Supreme Court of Canada, 25 September 1901

By-election: On Mr. Farquharson's death, 26 June 1903

See also 

 List of Canadian federal electoral districts
 Past Canadian electoral districts

External links 
Riding history for West Queen's (1892–1903) from the Library of Parliament

Former federal electoral districts of Prince Edward Island